The Shire of Murweh is a local government area in the Maranoa district, which is part of South West Queensland, Australia. The administrative centre and largest town in the shire is Charleville. In June 2018, the Shire of Murweh had a population of 4,318.

History

Bidjara (Bidyara, Pitjara, Peechara) is an Australian Aboriginal language spoken by the Bidjara people. The Bidjara language region includes the landscape within the local government boundaries of the Murweh Shire Council, particularly the towns of Charleville, Augathella and Blackall as well as the properties of Nive Downs and Mount Tabor.

Murweh Division was created on 11 November 1879 as one of 74 divisions of Queensland under the Divisional Boards Act 1879 with a population of 1286.

On 11 October 1883, there was an adjustment of boundaries between Tambo Division and Murweh Division.

On 5 February 1889, the western part of Murweh Division was separated to create the new Adavale Division.

On 21 March 1894, under the "Local Government Act 1878", Subdivision 2 of the Murweh Division was separated to create a municipality called Borough of Charleville.

With the passage of the Local Authorities Act 1902, Murweh Division became the Shire of Murweh on 31 March 1903.

On 10 September 1960, the Town of Charleville (the successor of the Borough of Charleville) which had been separated from Murweh Division in 1894, was absorbed back into the Shire of Murweh .

Towns and localities
The Shire of Murweh includes the following towns and localities:

 Charleville
 Augathella
 Bakers Bend
 Boatman
 Caroline Crossing
 Clara Creek
 Cooladdi (Ghost Town)
 Gowrie Station
 Langlo
 Morven
 Murweh
 Nive
 Redford
 Riversleigh
 Sommariva
 Tyrconnel
 Upper Warrego
 Wallal
 Ward
 Westgate

Amenities 
Murweh Shire Council operates public libraries in Augathella, Charleville and Morven. all three of these libraries have access to the internet through a high speed ISDN Broadband Internet Connection (provided through the National Broadband Network) to Brisbane.

The Murweh Shire Council operates the Charleville Airport and the aerodromes in Augathella, Morven and Cooladdi.

Murweh Shire Council also owns and operates these parks and recreational facilities throughout the shire

Augathella

 Brassington Park, Bendee Street, Augathella
 Meat Ant Park, 73 Main Street, Augathella
 Warrego Park, Corner Welch and Main Streets, Augathella

Charleville

 Graham Andrews Parkland, Sturt Street (Mitchell Highway), Charleville
 Baker Street Reserve, Baker Street, Charleville
 King Edward Park (original Charleville Showgrounds), Parry Street, Charleville
 Charleville Showgrounds, Partridge Street, Charleville (near Charleville State High School)
 Anzac Park, Wills Street, Charleville

Morven

 Memorial Park, Albert Street, Morven
 Morven Recreation Grounds (encompassing Sadlier's Waterhole), Corner Nebine Road and Old Charleville Road, Morven

Population

Shire Chambers

The first Murweh council chambers were built in the 1880s but were destroyed by fire in the 1930s.

The new Murweh Shire Council Chambers were opened in Alfred Street in February 1938 by the shire chairman William Herbert Corbett. The architects were Hall and Phillips and the contractor was T. E. Woollon of Brisbane.

The chambers suffered extensive damage during the 1990 flood which devastated Charleville. Repairs were carried out by Q-Build in late 1990. These repairs held fast in the 1997 flood that hit Charleville, but suffered moderate damage during the 2010 flood that hit Charleville.

Chairmen and mayors

 1927: John William Simes Gildea
 1938: William Herbert Corbett
 1988–2002 : Graham Andrews
 2002–2008: Wendy Choice-Brooks
 2008–2012 : Mark O'Brien
 2012–2016 : Denis Cook
 2016–2020: Anne Liston
2020–present: Shaun Radnedge

References

 
Local government areas of Queensland
South West Queensland
1879 establishments in Australia